Rakhi (1949 film), starring Kamini Kaushal
 Rakhi (1962 film)
 Rakhi (2006 film)
 Rakhi (TV series), a drama serial appearing on the Indian Zee TV satellite television network
 Rakhi Bandhan, a 2016 Bengali drama series

People
 Rakhi Gulzar (also known as Raakhee), born 1947, a Bollywood actress
 Rakhi Sawant (born 1978), Indian model, and actress
 Rakhi Birla (born 1987), Indian politician
 Mahbuba Islam Rakhi (born 1993), Bangladeshi actress and model

Places
 Rakhi, Nepal, a town in Nepal

Other
 Raksha Bandhan, an Indian festival, on which a string bracelet called rakhi, is tied by girls on their brothers' wrists
 Rakhi flower, Indian term for passion flowers (Passiflora)

See also
 Raki (disambiguation)